La cruz del diablo (translation: The Devil's Cross) is a 1975 Spanish horror film directed by John Gilling (his first film since he left Hammer Films in 1967) and starring Carmen Sevilla, Adolfo Marsillach, Ramiro Oliveros and Emma Cohen.  Its plot concerns a hashish-smoking British writer who travels to Spain to visit his sister, only to discover she has been murdered by a satanic cult. 

The screenplay, written by Paul Naschy, was based on three short stories written by Gustavo Adolfo Bécquer: La cruz del diablo, El monte de las animas and Maese Perez, organista. Naschy wrote the script with the intention of playing the lead role in the film.

Thinking it would help his chances of getting the film made, Naschy turned financial control over to Juan Jose Porto, whom Naschy considered a trusted friend, who (according to Naschy) betrayed that trust and cut Naschy out of the project altogether by selling Naschy's script to a producer named Quique Herreros Jr. without Naschy's knowledge and then rewriting much of the story. To compound the problem, director John Gilling decided not to use Naschy in the lead role, since he didn't think much of Naschy's acting abilities. They went ahead with filming the project in September 1974 without even notifying Naschy that it had been greenlighted. Naschy sued and won a very small token settlement and a screenwriting credit which he didn't want any more because he felt they had totally ruined his script with all the changes that were made. The whole incident remained a major sore point with Naschy for the rest of his life.

The film was only released theatrically in Spain in March of 1975, and was never dubbed in English nor shown outside of Spain. The Knights Templar in the film bring to mind the then-popular "Blind Dead" films of Amando de Ossorio, whose fourth film in the series Night of the Seagulls was released soon after The Devil's Cross. 

For years, The Devil's Cross was thought to be a lost film, but a decade later, it turned up on Spanish TV and then mid-grade quality copies started popping up on gray market video. The film is available today on DVD only in Spanish with English subtitles.

Plot
A hashish-smoking British writer, Alfred Dawson (Ramiro Oliveros), has been suffering from vivid nightmares. The subjects of the recurring nightmares are a marauding cult of undead medieval Knights Templars on horseback tormenting a woman in white, who cries for help. He is unsure whether the dreams are caused by the hashish, or are some sort of vision. Alfred's sister Justine, fearing she is in danger, asks him to visit her in Spain, where she lives with her wealthy Spanish husband. However, when Alfred arrives, he discovers that she has been murdered. He vows to find the murderer, even as it leads him and his companions to the fearful region of the Devil's Cross and the ruins of the Templars' castle.

Cast
 Carmen Sevilla – Maria
 Adolfo Marsillach – Cesar del Rio
 Emma Cohen – Beatriz
 Ramiro Oliveros – Alfred Dawson
 Eduardo Fajardo – Enrique Carrillo
 Mónica Randall – Justine Carrillo
 Tony Isbert – Iñigo de Ataíde
 Fernando Sancho – Ignacio
 Silvia Vivó – Ines
 Eduardo Calvo – Prison Director 
 Pascual Hernández – Civil Guard
 Antonio Ramis – Criado

Reception

Writing in The Zombie Movie Encyclopedia, academic Peter Dendle called it "a disappointing final film for ex-Hammer Studios director John Gilling".  Glenn Kay, who wrote Zombie Movies: The Ultimate Guide, described it as an out of print film that is considered "uninspired and unimpressive" by those who have seen it. Little English-language commentary, however, exists from those who have actually seen the film and who also understand Spanish.

References

External links

1975 films
1975 horror films
Spanish horror films
1970s Spanish-language films
Films directed by John Gilling
1970s Spanish films